Alkalihalobacillus bogoriensis is a Gram-positive, strictly aerobic, spore-forming, alkaliphilic and non-motil bacterium from the genus of Alkalihalobacillus which has been isolated from Lake Bogoria.

References

Bacillaceae
Bacteria described in 2005